Guido Menasci (24 March 1867 – 27 December 1925) was an Italian opera librettist.

His best-known work is Cavalleria rusticana written with Giovanni Targioni-Tozzetti. He also provided the libretti for Mascagni's I Rantzau, Zanetto, for Umberto Giordano's Regina Diaz and Viktor Parma's Stara pesem (Old Song).

Menasci was born and died in Livorno.

External links
 
 

1867 births
1925 deaths
People from Livorno
Italian opera librettists
Italian male dramatists and playwrights
19th-century Italian dramatists and playwrights
19th-century Italian male writers
20th-century Italian dramatists and playwrights
20th-century Italian male writers